Jason Buhrmester (born 1973 in Kankakee, Illinois ), is a journalist, author and the Chief Content Officer at Reader's Digest. He was previously Editorial Director of Playboy magazine where he oversaw the magazine's 2016 relaunch. Previously, he has written for Playboy, Maxim, Spin, Village Voice, Wired, and others. His first novel, Black Dogs: The Possibly True Story of Classic Rock's Greatest Robbery debuted in April, 2009. The book is the fictional story of four Baltimore teens who rob Led Zeppelin in 1973. It was published by Three Rivers Press, a division of Random House. It has been optioned for film production. His upcoming second novel 54321 has been optioned by Mace Neufeld based on a screenplay by Daniel Pyne.

References

External links 
 Official Site

Living people
People from Kankakee, Illinois
1973 births
Writers from Illinois
21st-century American journalists